BRP Malamawi (FPB-2403) is the third of four Boracay class Patrol Boats built by OCEA of France for the Philippine Coast Guard based on the Ocea FPB 72 design.

Construction, delivery and commissioning
BRP Malamawi was launched in July 2018 at the OCEA site in Les Sables d’Olonne, France and was commissioned into service in Manila, Philippines in January 2019 along with her sister ship, .

References

Ships of the Philippine Coast Guard
2018 ships
Ships built in France